HMS Marazion was a Hunt-class minesweeper launched by Fleming & Ferguson, Paisley, Yard No 453, on 15 April 1919 and sold in March 1933 in Hong Kong.

See also
 Marazion, Cornwall

References
 
 http://www.battleships-cruisers.co.uk/aberdare_class.htm#HMS%20Marazion

 

Hunt-class minesweepers (1916)
Royal Navy ship names
1919 ships
Ships built on the River Clyde
Auxiliary ships of the Royal Navy
Royal Navy Submarine Depot Ships
Submarine tenders